Nurses is an American, Portland-based Avant-pop group with vocals, guitar, and keyboard. Their sound is often categorized as psychedelic pop The duo joined  Dead Oceans Records on May 21, 2009 and released two albums via Dead Oceans, with Apple's Acre being issued on August 4, 2009 (August 24 in the UK). They have been described as a shaggy younger sibling of Animal Collective singing with the sound of dreamy harmonies, carnival organs, slightly out-of-tune pianos and basic percussion from a lone snare or tambourine and received a 7.2 rating from Pitchfork. While Dracula was released on September 20, 2011.

Nurses toured with the Swedish folk musician The Tallest Man on Earth in 2010, and Stephen Malkmus and the Jicks in February 2012 

A$AP Rocky and members of A$AP Mob freestyled over Nurses' track "You Lookin' Twice" for Pitchfork's Selector in December 2011.

"Yours to Keep" will be the closing track from Naughtyland, their latest album, which is due to be released on October 6, 2017.

Discography
Naughtland (2017)
Dracula (Dead Oceans; 2011)
Apple's Acre (Dead Oceans; 2009)
Hangin' Nothin' but Our Hands Down (Sargent House; 2007)

References

External links
Nurses on Dead Oceans
Nurses Interview at REDEFINE Magazine, August 2009, January 2012
Nurses Album Reviews on Pitchfork

Indie rock musical groups from Idaho
Musical groups from Portland, Oregon
Dead Oceans artists
Sargent House artists